The 2019 NACAC Cross Country Championships took place on February 16, 2019.  The races were held at the Queen's Park Savannah in Port-of-Spain, Trinidad and Tobago.  A detailed report of the event was given for the IAAF.

Medallists

Race results

Senior Women's race (10 km)

Senior Men's race (10 km)

Junior (U20) women's race (6 km)

Junior (U20) men's race (8 km)

Medal table (unofficial)

Note: Totals include both individual and team medals, with medals in the team competition counting as one medal.

Participation
According to an unofficial count, 99 athletes from 8 countries participated.

 (4)
 (22)
 (4)
 (10)
 (14)
 (14)
 (8)
 (23)

See also
 2019 in athletics (track and field)

References

NACAC Cross Country Championships
NACAC Cross Country Championships
NACAC Cross Country Championships
NACAC Cross Country Championships
Cross country running in Trinidad and Tobago
NACAC Cross Country Championships